Plaisance National Park is a provincial park located near Plaisance in the province of Quebec, Canada.

References
This article was initially translated from the French Wikipedia.

External links
Plaisance National Park - official site

National parks of Quebec
Protected areas of Outaouais
Canada geography articles needing translation from French Wikipedia